Livia Zaugg (born 29 January 1996, Kilchberg, Zürich) is a Swiss volleyball player. She is a member of the Women's National Team.
She participated at the 2018 Montreux Volley Masters.
She plays for Sm'Aesch Pfeffingen.

References

External links 

 FIVB Profile
 

1996 births
Living people
Swiss women's volleyball players
People from Horgen District
Sportspeople from the canton of Zürich